Saugatuck may refer to

Connecticut, US
 Saugatuck, Connecticut, a neighborhood in the town of Westport
 Saugatuck Reservoir
 Saugatuck River
 Saugatuck River Bridge
 Saugatuck River Railroad Bridge

Michigan, US
 Saugatuck, Michigan
 Saugatuck Township, Michigan
 Saugatuck Dunes State Park
 Saugatuck Chain Ferry